Petaloconchus keenae is a worm snail common in intertidal and subtidal areas in Hawaiʻi and the tropical Pacific. It has a symbiotic relationship with multiple coral genera, such as Porites, Montipora, and Pavona.

References

 Hadfield, M. G. & Kay, E. A. In: Hadfield, M.G., Kay, E.A, Gillette, M.U. & Lloyd, M.C. (1972). The Vermetidae (Mollusca: Gastropoda) of the Hawaiian Islands. Marine Biology. 12(1): 81-98

External links
 Hadfield, M. G. & Kay, E. A. In: Hadfield, M.G., Kay, E.A, Gillette, M.U. & Lloyd, M.C. (1972). The Vermetidae (Mollusca: Gastropoda) of the Hawaiian Islands. Marine Biology. 12(1): 81-98
 Bieler, R.; Petit, R. E. (2011). Catalogue of Recent and fossil “worm-snail” taxa of the families Vermetidae, Siliquariidae, and Turritellidae (Mollusca: Caenogastropoda). Zootaxa. 2948: 1-103

Vermetidae
Molluscs of the Pacific Ocean
Gastropods described in 1972